A tortilla is a thin, circular unleavened flatbread from Mexico and Central America originally made from maize hominy meal, and now also from wheat flour. 

The Aztecs and other Nahuatl speakers called tortillas tlaxcalli. First made by the indigenous peoples of Mesoamerica before colonization, tortillas are a cornerstone of Mesoamerican cuisine. Corn tortillas in Mesoamerica are known from as early as 500 BCE.

Varieties

Corn

Tortillas made from nixtamalized maize meal—masa de maíz— are the oldest variety of tortilla. They originated in Mexico and Central America, and remain popular throughout the Americas. Peoples of the Oaxaca region in Mexico first made tortillas at the end of the Villa Stage (1500 to 500 BC). Towards the end of the 19th century, the first mechanical utensils for making tortillas, called tortilla presses, tortilleras, or tortilladoras, were invented and manufactured in Mexico.

Wheat

Europeans introduced wheat and its cultivation to the American continent, and it remains the source for wheat flour tortillas. Wheat flour tortillas were originated in the northern region of Mexico.

Wheat tortillas usually contain fats such as oil or lard, salt, often leavening agents such as baking powder, and other ingredients. Otherwise, the preparation and cooking of flour tortillas on a comal is identical to that of corn tortillas. Flour tortillas are commonly used in dishes like burritos, tacos, and fajitas. It is part of the daily food repertoire throughout Mexico, whose gastronomy and culture has influenced those of many Central American countries and some states in the U.S.

Nopaltilla
A nopaltilla is a cactus-corn tortilla. The word is a portmanteau of nopal, Spanish for the Opuntia ficus-indica cactus, and tortilla.

See also
 Lavash 
 Arepa 
 Chapati
 Indigenous peoples of the Americas
 Latin American cuisine
 List of tortilla-based dishes
 Sopaipilla

References

 
American cuisine
Appetizers
Flatbreads
Belizean cuisine
Guatemalan cuisine
Honduran cuisine
Mexican cuisine
Salvadoran cuisine
Costa Rican cuisine
Mesoamerican cuisine
Guamanian cuisine
Spanish words and phrases
Staple foods